Colby Don Carthel (born August 29, 1976) is an American football coach who is the head coach at Stephen F. Austin State University, a position he has held since December 2018. Colby's first head coaching stint was at Texas A&M University-Commerce where he won the Division II National Championship in 2017.  Previous to his time as head coach, he was the defensive coordinator for his father and former West Texas A&M University head coach, Don Carthel, from 2006 to 2012. He played college football at Angelo State University where he was an all-conference linebacker.

Early life
Carthel was born in Floydada, Texas and was reared in West Texas. He attended Friona High School in Friona, Texas where he captained the football team and led them to a district championship during the 1994 season. He also went to the State Track & Field Championships for his high school, placing fourth in the discus throw. He graduated from Friona High School in 1995.

Playing career
Carthel played college football at Angelo State University. He started at linebacker for the Rams during his senior season in 1999 and helped lead them to a Lone Star Conference title. He was a four-year letterman and starter for the Angelo State, as well as a three-time Academic All-Conference winner. He graduated in 2000 with a degree in biology.

Coaching career

Early career
Upon graduation from Angelo State in 2000, Carthel began his coaching career as the defensive line coach and recruiting coordinator at Abilene Christian University, where he remained until 2006. In 2006 his father, Don Carthel, named him the defensive coordinator on his staff at West Texas A&M University.

Texas A&M–Commerce
In 2013, Carthel was hired as the 19th head football coach at Texas A&M University-Commerce. The program was coming off of two back-to-back 1–9 seasons, the worst two year stretch in school history. Carthel quickly established a new culture in Commerce that saw 50 of the 85 players leave the program. Carthel and his staff quickly plugged in the missing parts with mainly Junior College transfers and Division I transfers to quickly rebuild the program. Former Auburn University quarterback Tyrik Rollison, who had been considered the best high school quarterback in Texas in the class of 2010, transferred to Texas A&M-Commerce and was one of many JUCO and Division I players from the Dallas/Fort Worth and Northeast Texas area that transferred to A&M-Commerce to play for the Lions.

2013 season
Carthel and the Lions started his first season by opening with a home win again Sul Ross State University 51–6. The next week in front of 20,000 LSC fans at AT&T Stadium, Carthel's Lions upset the 22nd ranked Delta State. The next week Carthel the Lions faced off with his former team, West Texas A&M in Canyon, Texas. The Lions stunned the crowd by jumping out to a 14–7 lead, but were bested by a prolific Buffalo team 68–28, and then dropped a 30–24 decision to Midwestern State the next week in Commerce. After a 2–2 start, the Lions rolled out 4 straight wins defeating Southeastern Oklahoma State 31–29, Texas A&M-Kingsville 41–28, McMurry 65–43, and arch-rival Tarleton State 22–20. The Lions rounded out the season by dropping a close loss to the Angelo State Rams 25–20, bouncing back against Division I Houston Baptist Huskies 55–21, and ending the season with a last second 42–35 loss to Eastern New Mexico. Despite the late season loss, the Lions were invited to the 2013 LiveUnited Texarkana Bowl to finish the season 7–5 overall and fifth in the conference.

2014 season
Carthel's 2014 A&M–Commerce squad led the nation in points per game with an average of 54.1, and yards per game with an average of 535.4. They opened the season with a record-breaking performance against East Texas Baptist in which they scored 98 points and amassed 986 total yards of offense and 13 touchdowns. The win gained the Lions national exposure as it was reported on ESPN's SportsCenter that same night. The next day, head coach Colby Carthel was interviewed by ESPN's Linda Cohn in regards to the win. In that win the Lions set national and conference records for points scored, yards gained, and total offense in a game. The Lions also defeated A&M-Kingsville, Tarleton State, West Texas A&M, Angelo State, and Tarleton State a second time in the conference playoffs. The lone losses were to the Division I Stephen F. Austin State Lumberjacks, Midwestern State, and to Angelo State in a conference finals rematch. The Lions won the Lone Star Conference championship for the 21st time in school history, the first time since the 1990 season. The Lions were left out of the NCAA playoffs, but were invited back to the postseason, which resulted in a 72–21 win over East Central University in the C.H.A.M.P.S. Heart of Texas Bowl, the win was the first postseason win for the program since a 1991 win over Grand Valley State in the 1991 NCAA first round of the playoffs to finish the season 9–3. The 2014 team saw Ricky Collins, Vernon Johnson, and Charles Tuaau be called to the NFL.

2015 season
Prior to the start of the 2015 season the Lions were picked second to finish behind Angelo State. The Lions started out with a win against Adams State followed by a loss to a top ten Delta State team in a last second thriller. Carthel then guided the Lions to their second straight conference championship with an undefeated conference record, and qualified for the NCAA Division II playoffs for the first time since 1995, where they lost to the Ferris State Bulldogs in the first round of the playoffs, finishing 8–4 overall ranked #20 in the nation. The Lions were guided by former University of Nevada QB Harrison Stewart, Running Back Richard Cooper, Receiver Lance Evans, and Defensive Standouts Toni Pulu and Cole Pitts. Stewart threw for over 3,300 yards, putting him second all time for single season passing yards in Lion football History, while Cooper was an All-American and Evans, Pulu, and Pitts were all first team All-LSC Conference. The Lions led the conference in passing offense and total offense.

2016 season
In the spring of 2016, Carthel was rewarded with a contract extension with options that would keep him Commerce until 2018. In his first three seasons as head coach he led the team to a total of three postseason appearances, two LSC championships, and seven or more wins in each season. He also helped lead a number of players to the NFL. 

Carthel's Lions started the season ranked 9th in the nation and picked to win the Lone Star Conference for the third straight year. All-American running back Richard Cooper returned for his senior season and was picked preseason conference back of the year. The Lions ran out to a 5-0 record to start the season, but lost by 1 point to Midwestern State in a back and forth affair in Commerce. The Lions then reeled off 5 straight wins and clinched their third straight LSC Championship after Midwestern lost to Eastern New Mexico in the final game of the season. The Lions once again were selected for the NCAA Division II national playoffs and hosted a first-round game for the first time since 1991. The Lions defeated 24th ranked Colorado-Mesa, setting them up with the second ranked Grand Valley State Lakers. The Lions bowed out in the second round to the Lakers, ending the season at 11-2. Lions Quarterback Luis Perez was selected as a Harlon Hill Trophy nominee, while punter Hector Dominguez was first team All-American and offensive lineman Jared Machorro was named second team All-American. Return specialist Shawn Hooks and linebacker Uriah Harris were both named All-Region team and the Lions placed 8 members on the All-Lone Star Conference first team, including Cooper, Perez, Hooks, Harris, Dominguez, Machorro, Defensive lineman Tavita Faaiu, and Wideout Lance Evans. The Lions 11-2 season was the most wins for the Lions since 1953 and the first time the Lions had double digit wins since 1990. In December 2016, TAMUC President Dr. Ray Keck and Athletic Director Tim McMurray announced they were extending Carthel's contract yet again, this time until 2020.

2017 season
Carthel's Lions were picked to win a fourth straight Lone Star Conference title by the league's coaches and media. All-American Quarterback Luis Perez returned for his Senior season along with Pre-Season All-American Jared Machorro. The Lions started their season 4-0, reaching # 2 in the polls before losing to Midwestern State University in a close 47-42 affair. The Lions finished the season 9-1, second in the Lone Star Conference behind Midwestern State. The Lions qualified for the NCAA Division II playoffs for the third straight season. In the first round, the Lions traveled to Winona State University and defeated the Warriors 20-6. In the second round, the Lions defeated Central Washington University in come from behind fashion in double overtime, 34-31. In the Super Region 4 Championship game, the Lions defeated Minnesota State University-Mankato 31-21. The Lions then hosted the Harding Bisons at Memorial Stadium in Commerce, Texas in the National semifinals, the first time the Lions had played in the National semifinals since being in the NAIA during the 1980 season. The Lions defeated the Bison 31-17 to earn a spot in the National Championship game against West Florida University. The Lions defeated the Argonauts 37-27 to win their first National Championship since 1972 and their first since as a member of the NCAA. Lions Quarterback Luis Perez won the Harlon Hill Trophy, and the Lions finished the season ranked a consensus # 1 in the country.

2018 season
Carthel's Lions were selected as a preseason national # 1 team and also picked to win the Lone Star Conference. The season started with a televised overtime thriller by beating rival Texas A&M-Kingsville for the 7th straight season, something no other Lion coach had ever done. The Lions then defeated William Jewell College 27-17 and Lone Star Conference foe Eastern New Mexico 21-11. The Lions then lost their first game of the season to 22nd ranked Colorado State Pueblo 23-13. The Loss to CSU-P was only the second time in the Carthel era that the Lions were held without an offensive touchdown. The Lions made personnel changes on offense and rebounded to soundly defeat Lock Haven (Pennsylvania) 68-6, and then avenged their only loss of the previous season by beating Midwestern State 20-19. The MSU game was played in odd circumstances as the Lions and Mustangs played to a 10-10 tie in the first half in Wichita Falls, Texas, but could not continue due to inclement weather. The schools mutually agreed to continue the second half of the game at Apogee Stadium on the campus of The University of North Texas in Denton, Texas that following afternoon. After defeating MSU, the Lions lost for the first time in 5 years to A&M System rival Tarleton State University 47-21. Again, the Lions rebounded by routing Western New Mexico 55-7 and defeating another cross state rival, West Texas A&M, 41-16. The Lions finished the season with a close win against Texas-Permian Basin 20-17 and clinched a spot in the NCAA Division II playoffs for the fourth straight season with a 41-13 win over Angelo State. The Lions finished the regular season with a 9-2 record, a # 15 national ranking, LSC runner-ups, and Carthel was named Lone Star Conference Coach of The Year. They then defeated an undefeated and top 5 ranked Minnesota-Duluth team 33-17 in the first round of the NCAA Division II Playoffs, before bowing out in a second round rematch against conference foe Tarleton State 34-28 to end the year at 10-3.

Stephen F. Austin
On December 2, 2018, Carthel was named the head  football coach at Stephen F. Austin State University.

Personal life

Carthel is married to Sarah Carthel (née Butler), who is one of the Lone Star Conference's most successful volleyball players and coaches. Upon her husband's move to Commerce, she resigned her position at WT and became assistant head coach for the A&M–Commerce volleyball program. The Carthels have a one-year-old son named Major and reside in Commerce.

Head coaching record

References

External links
 Stephen F. Austin profile
 Texas A&M–Commerce profile

1976 births
Living people
American football linebackers
Abilene Christian Wildcats football coaches
Angelo State Rams football players
Stephen F. Austin Lumberjacks football coaches
Texas A&M–Commerce Lions football coaches
West Texas A&M Buffaloes football coaches
People from Floydada, Texas
People from Parmer County, Texas
Coaches of American football from Texas
Players of American football from Texas